John Denby (born 16 August 1946) is a British luger. He competed in the men's doubles event at the 1980 Winter Olympics.

References

External links
 

1946 births
Living people
British male lugers
Olympic lugers of Great Britain
Lugers at the 1980 Winter Olympics
Place of birth missing (living people)